Leonard Brand is a Seventh-day Adventist creationist, biologist, paleontologist, and author. He is a professor and past chair of Loma Linda University Department of Earth and Biological Sciences.

As a Creationist, he teaches interventionism, a view of history that holds that there is intelligent intervention in history.   His desire for respectful dialogue has been welcomed by advocates on both sides of the creation–evolution controversy. He challenges his fellow creationists to use caution when making scientific claims.

His most widely debated research was regarding fossil tracks at the Grand Canyon. He has a PhD in biology from Cornell University, received in 1970 when working for LLU La Sierra campus.

Scientific research

Brand began his scientific career in the study of small mammals. In 1968, Brand and Raymond Ryckman studied the systematics of deer mice (specifically the mainland cactus mouse and two related species isolated to nearby islands, the San Lorenzo and Angel Island mice. This was also the topic of Brand's masters. They confirmed the accepted taxonomy of these species, and showed that these species are still able to interbreed.

Starting in 1970, Brand reported on the tree nests and vocalisations of California chipmunks. This was also his PhD topic. Along with many other scientists, his reported methodologies and observations have added to the accumulating scientific knowledge of these mammals.

From 1999, the fossil remains of hundreds of whales (including the "Leviathan") were discovered as part of the Pisco formation in Peru. Brand and his associates studied the taphonomy of these well-articulated skeletons, and concluded that the burial of the whales in diatom sediment had been a very rapid event. 

In 2000, Brand et al. have conducted field research on fossil turtles in the Bridger Formation of Wyoming.   He has also been involved in taphonomy experiments using modern animal carcasses, particularly intended to aid understanding of the features of fossil turtles.

In the field of ichnology,  Brand, along with Thu Tang, Andrew A. Snelling, and Steven Austin has proposed that fossil tracks in the Grand Canyon's Coconino Sandstone point to underwater deposition, rather than desert wind deposition of dry sand.      Brand and Tang studied western newts walking on sand under 4 cm of flowing water in an aquarium tank. By analogy, they concluded that at least part of the Coconino Sandstone was deposited under water.  This hypothesis has been criticized by geologists who interpret evidence supporting sub-aerial formation.

Geologist Martin Lockley describes Brand's Salamander trackway study as "seriously flawed" and notes that Brand links the underwater tracks theory to the idea that the Grand Canyon was formed entirely by a catastrophic, biblical-style flood, a view which Lockley calls geologically naive and disingenuous. He criticizes Brand's book Faith, Reason and Earth History for "leaving out any discussion of the objections published by geologists to his interpretation." Lockley does, however, commend Brand for admitting that creationists have made mistakes and that science-bashing can be counter-productive, for advocating respectful engagement, and for raising thought-provoking philosophical questions regarding evolution and sociobiology.

A number of studies have found evidence contradicting Brand and Tang's conclusions and Lockley and Hunt's 1995 book Dinosaur Tracks and Other Fossil Footprints of the Western United States suggests an alternative explanation with the tracks being made in air by extinct mammal-like reptiles called caseids. Inconsistencies that contradict the underwater hypothesis include:
tracks demonstrating various running gaits impossible under water, at various angles to the slope;
tracks made by many forms of invertebrates which would not leave prolific underwater tracks, including some which could only be made on completely dry sand; and
raindrop impressions.

Apart from the controversy, his observations of underwater foot prints have been cited in peer-reviewed journals.

In his report on laboratory controlled simulations of dinosaur footprints in sand, Simon J. Jackson cites eight scientists, including Brand. He says,

Brand has also been involved in research not published in mainstream scientific journals. In 1970 Berney Neufeld, Brand and Art Chadwick studied the controversial Paluxy tracks and, contrary to many creationists at that time, concluded that those tracks did not provide valid evidence for the coexistence of humans and dinosaurs.

Creationism

On November 9, 1972, the California State Board of Education held hearings to examine creation science. Leonard Brand, along with Loma Linda University colleague Ariel Roth, made presentations. Brand contended that creationist views are misunderstood in that creationists also believe in evolution of species within the major groups of plants and animals.  The evidence for this was very good, he said. They "have no argument with experimental evidence." In conclusion, he stated that students in California schools should be allowed to hear both theories and form their own conclusions.

Leonard Brand has authored two books on the creation–evolution controversy, Faith, Reason and Earth History (1997, 2nd Ed. 2009) and Beginnings (2007). Both are published in English and Spanish, and the former is also published in Portuguese.

Ichnologist Martin Lockley wrote a critical review of FREH, accusing Brand of unscrupulousness and ignorance. He said the book "shows us, on the one hand, a very curious mix of what appear to be a few genuine attempts, by creationists, to do good science, or at least better science than they have done in the past, and, on the other hand, what appear to be quite ridiculous and extraordinarily naive interpretations of classic geological localities such as the Grand Canyon."

Young Earth Creationists include Leonard Brand among their leaders. They often cite his field and lab research as evidence for the biblical flood. Marcus R. Ross of Liberty University includes Brand's Faith, Reason and Earth's History in a short list of "well-researched YEC writings on geology." These "excellent sources" include Steven Austin, Kurt Wise, Leonard Brand and Andrew A. Snelling. In August, 2008, Brand gave the keynote address at the Seventh Creation Biology Study Groups Conference entitled  “Origins Research: A Better Worldview Yields Better Research Questions.”

Brand participates in the creation–evolution controversy less confrontationally than many creationists.  Young and Stearley, two Christian geologists who disagree with Brand's young earth views, state that he, along with Ariel Roth and some other recent flood geology advocates "have a much more irenic and moderate tone that provides a welcome contrast to the sarcastic, sometimes disrespectful tone and unwarrantedly dogmatic pronouncements of earlier creationists." In a foreword to Brand's book Faith, Reason and Earth History Kurt Wise applauds the book for breaking free from the "science-bashing spirit" prevalent in creationist literature. Lockley suggests that Brand is "writing for people of faith" and that his more sympathetic approach may have a greater impact in "educat[ing] creationists to a scientific way of thinking" than the more confrontational approach of many anti-creationists.

Brand argues for integrity in creationist arguments, against using material that has many errors and writing "without having the scientific training to match their zeal."

In his PhD dissertation, Thomas McIver reports that:

Brand distinguishes between scientific data and presuppositions:

Brand teaches that his biblical views help him propose questions for research. On page 8 of the book Beginnings, he states,

Seventh-day Adventist church
The Seventh-day Adventist Church has recognized Brand as a thought leader in matters of science and origins since the early 1970s. He has served on the SDA church's science council from 1976 to 2003. He oversaw the development of the church's earth sciences program at Loma Linda University. He has taught science methodology in regional church conference and has explained creationist concepts to students in public colleges.

In the area of doctrinal apologetics, Brand has published a book in response to the major critics of church founder Ellen G. White.

In 1978, church leaders approved Loma Linda University's Department of Biology masters program in earth history. As head of the department, Brand explained the rationale for the program,

The prophet and her critics
In 2005, Don S. McMahon, an Australian medical specialist, and Leonard Brand co-authored the book The prophet and her critics. It was published by the Pacific Press Publishing Association. The core issue treated in their book is Ellen White's writings on health. In the first four chapters, Brand reports on the earlier research of Ron Numbers on health (1976), Jon Butler on prophetic fulfilment (1979) and Walter Rea on literary relationships (1982). He proposes that these earlier research studies should be examined for their use of logic, interpretation of data, and whether they had good research designs.

Numbers reports,

He criticises both of McMahon's books:

Publications

Thesis

Books

Journals

Presentations
 (California State Board of Education hearing re: including creation as a theory of origins along with evolution.)

See also

Creationism
Flood geology
Young Earth creationism
Paleobiology
Taphonomy
Mammalogy
Ichnology
Martin Lockley
Man Track Controversy
Coconino Sandstone
 Seventh-day Adventist Church
 Seventh-day Adventist theology
 History of the Seventh-day Adventist Church

Notes

References
Books

Journals

URL

1941 births
Living people
American geologists
21st-century American biologists
American paleontologists
Cornell University alumni
Loma Linda University faculty
American Christian creationists
American Seventh-day Adventists
Seventh-day Adventist theologians
Intelligent design advocates
People from Loma Linda, California